D'Alegria is a Brazilian company specialized in manufacturing custom-made electric guitars and basses. The company was established in 2003 in Rio de Janeiro by partners Daniel Alegria and Rodrigo Werneck, and distributes its products worldwide.

Models

Basic models 

 Dart - 4, 5 or 6-string bass, presenting the Dart, A-Dart ("Acoustic Dart") and Double Dart versions
 Defender - 4 or 5-string bass, presenting the JB and JB Deluxe versions
 Dragster - 4 or 5-string bass
 Discovery - 4-string electric upright bass (EUB), with piezo pickups
 Dimension - 6-string electric guitar
 Dragon - 4, 5, 6 or 7-string bass

Signature models 
 Defender TB - 4-string fretted bass, Trevor Bolder's signature model
 Defender TP - 5-string fretted bass, Trae Pierce's signature model
 Dimension JD - 6-string guitar, Jan Dumée's signature model
 Defender JP - 5-string fretted bass, Jorge Pescara's signature model
 Dart FA - 6-string fretted bass, Felipe Andreoli's signature model
 A-Dart FA - 6-string fretless bass, Felipe Andreoli's signature model
 Dart AN - 6-string fretted bass, André Neiva's signature model
 Dynamo AG - 4-string fretted bass (short fingerboard, 32 inches), André Gomes's signature model

Artists 
Some musicians who play/have played D'Alegria instruments are:
 Trevor Bolder (Uriah Heep, Wishbone Ash and David Bowie)
 Trae Pierce (Blind Boys of Alabama, and James Brown's and Dr. Hook's bands)
 Jan Dumée (On The Rocks, Focus)
 Jorge Pescara (Ithamara Koorax, Dom Um Romão, Eumir Deodato, Luiz Bonfá, ZERO, Fernando Girão, solo)
 Felipe Andreoli (Angra and Karma)
 Arthur Maia (Gilberto Gil's band)
 Ako Kiiski (Wishbone Ash)
 Dennis Ward (Pink Cream 69)
 Dudu Lima (Stanley Jordan's band)
 André Gomes (Pepeu Gomes's band, and Cheiro de Vida)

See also
Jorge Pescara

References

External links
 Official website (archived 2 Mar 2009)

Guitar manufacturing companies
Bass guitar manufacturing companies
Musical instrument manufacturing companies of Brazil
Manufacturing companies based in Rio de Janeiro (city)
Brazilian brands